The  was a Bo-Bo-Bo wheel arrangement DC electric locomotive operated by JR Freight on freight services in Japan from 1992  until its retirement on 28 March 2019.

Overview
The Class EF200 was developed to replace Class EF66 electric locomotives on heavy freight services on the Tokaido Main Line and Sanyo Main Line west of Tokyo. Ultimately, the class was deemed to be over-specified and unnecessarily expensive, and the order was terminated after the delivery of 20 full-production locomotives. The subsequent Class EF210 was instead chosen as the standard design for hauling freight services on the Tokaido Main Line and Sanyo Main Line. Originally designed to haul  freight trains, problems of insufficient power supply capacity to the overhead lines, meant that the class was initially limited to hauling  trains.

Operations
, the fleet consists of 12 locomotives (EF200-2 – 7, 10, 15, and 17 – 20), based at Suita Depot in Osaka. They are used primarily on 1,300 t freight trains west of Tokyo on the Tokaido and Sanyo Main Lines.

Variants
 EF200-900: Prototype locomotive EF200-901, built 1990
 EF200-0: Full-production locomotives EF200-1 – 20, built 1992–1993

History
The prototype locomotive, EF200-901, was delivered in March 1990 for extensive testing. The first full-production locomotives were delivered to Shin-Tsurumi Depot in Tokyo in 1992, entering revenue service on the Tokaido Main Line and Sanyo Main Line from the summer of that year. In 1992, the Class EF200 was awarded the Laurel Prize, presented annually by the Japan Railfan Club.

From 1 April 1999, the entire class was transferred from Shin-Tsurumi in Tokyo to Suita Depot in Osaka.
Between 2006 and 2009, the entire fleet was repainted into a new livery similar to that used for the later Class EF210 locomotives. EF200-901 was similarly repainted in 2007.

From 2007, the class was power-derated to match the power output of the older Class EF66 locomotives. In 2011, one class member, EF200-1, was withdrawn.

During fiscal 2015, eight members of the class were removed from regular duties, leaving 12 members in service. The final service of the Class EF200 took place on 28 March 2019, as EF200-18 hauled its last freight train from the Hatabu yard in Shimonoseki to the Suita freight terminal in Osaka.

Preserved examples

The prototype locomotive, EF200-901, was withdrawn in March 2016 and moved to the Hitachi Mito factory in Hitachinaka, Ibaraki, in October 2016, where it was restored to its original livery.

Classification

The EF200 classification for this locomotive type is explained below. As with previous locomotive designs, the prototype was numbered EF200-901, with subsequent production locomotives numbered from EF200-1 onward.
 E: Electric locomotive
 F: Six driving axles
 200: DC locomotive with AC motors

References

External links

 JR Freight website 

1500 V DC locomotives
Electric locomotives of Japan
EF200
Bo-Bo-Bo locomotives
1067 mm gauge locomotives of Japan
Railway locomotives introduced in 1990
Hitachi locomotives